Auditorio Benito Juarez is a 2,500-seat indoor arena located in Los Mochis, Sinaloa, Mexico.

It is used primarily for basketball, boxing, lucha libre, concerts, and other events.  With 2,500 square meters (26,900 square feet) of exhibit space it is also Los Mochis' largest indoor convention center, allowing it to also be used for trade shows, conventions and banquets.

External links
Los Mochis at visitmexico.com

Indoor arenas in Mexico
Convention centers in Mexico
Buildings and structures in Sinaloa
Los Mochis
Boxing venues in Mexico
Volleyball venues in Mexico
Basketball venues in Mexico